Ball clays are kaolinitic sedimentary clays that commonly consist of 20–80% kaolinite, 10–25% mica and 6–65% quartz, along with small amounts of organic matter (such as lignite) and trace amounts of other minerals such as pyrite and siderite.

They are a common raw material for various types of ceramics, where their primary roles are to impart unfired strength, plasticity or to aid rheological stability during the shaping processes. Most ball clays impart colours ranging from buff to cream to off-white when fired in an oxidising atmosphere.

The name "ball clay" is derived from the form of the extracted material when dug by spade as cubes, which then became rounded during subsequent transport, in Devon, England during the early days of the industry during the 18th century.

In 2008, UK production of ball clay was reported to be worth £82 million, with sanitaryware manufacturers being the largest single group of end users, representing 40% by volume. In 2022, the global market for ball clay was estimated to be worth $US375 million, with the Asia-Pacific region being the biggest market accounting for 38.2% of sales.

Locations

They are relatively scarce deposits due to the combination of geological factors needed for their formation and preservation. Commercial extraction of ball clays is undertaken across the world, including:
Argentina (San Julian area of Patagonia)
Brazil (various locations including the region around São Paulo - São Simão, Suzano and Ribeirão Pire)
China (various including Guangdong Province)
Czech Republic (Cheb, Pilsen, Prague, Most, S. Bohemia and W. Moravia)
Germany (various locations but the main is the Westerwald region)
Indonesia (various locations including the island of Kalimantan)
Thailand (Lampang)
United Kingdom (the Bovey Basin of south Devon, the Petrockstow Basin in north Devon and the area around Wareham in south-east Dorset)
USA (Kenthcky, Tennessee and Texas)

Production output
Global production of ball clay by country for 2002-2003 was estimated to be:

Typical properties
Some selected typical properties of various UK ball clays are:

History in the UK
The ceramic use of ball clays in Britain dates back to at least the Roman era. More recent trade began when a clay was needed to make tobacco pipes in the 16th and 17th century.  In 1771 Josiah Wedgwood signed a contract for 1,400 tons a year of ball clay with Thomas Hyde of Purbeck, enabling the production of thinner-walled ceramics.

See also
Ball clay and the Stover Canal
Purbeck Ball Clay

References 

Pottery
Geology of Devon
Clay
Industrial minerals